is the third compilation album by Japanese entertainer Miho Nakayama. Released through King Records on November 21, 1990, the album compiles Nakayama's singles from 1988 to 1990, plus the new song "I Can't Follow You".

The album peaked at No. 2 on Oricon's albums chart. It sold over 392,000 copies and was certified Platinum by the RIAJ.

Track listing

Charts
Weekly charts

Year-end charts

Certification

References

External links
 
 
 

1990 compilation albums
Miho Nakayama compilation albums
Japanese-language compilation albums
King Records (Japan) compilation albums